Spilomyia maxima is a species of Hoverfly in the family Syrphidae.

Distribution
Russia.

References

Eristalinae
Insects described in 1910
Taxa named by Pius Sack
Diptera of Asia